Miss America 2004, the 77th Miss America pageant, was broadcast from the Boardwalk Hall in Atlantic City, New Jersey on Saturday, September 20, 2003 on ABC Network.

Results

Placements

Awards

Preliminary awards

Quality of Life award

Final night awards

Non-finalist awards

Delegates

1 Age as of September 2003

Judges
Greta Van Susteren
Jon Spoelstra
Kimberly Clarice Aiken
Fletcher Foster
Donald Welch
Rebecca Stafford
Camille Lavington

External links
 Official Results

2004
2003 in the United States
2004 beauty pageants
2003 in New Jersey
September 2003 events in the United States
Events in Atlantic City, New Jersey